The 6th Senate district of Wisconsin is one of 33 districts in the Wisconsin State Senate.  Located in southeast Wisconsin, the district is contained in north-central Milwaukee County.  It includes parts of north, west, and downtown Milwaukee, as well as eastern Wauwatosa.  It contains landmarks such as the Marquette University campus, Fiserv Forum, the Milwaukee Public Museum, historic Holy Cross Cemetery, and the Miller Brewing Company.

Current elected officials
La Tonya Johnson is the senator representing the 6th district. Now in her second term, she was first elected in the 2016 general election, after the previous senator, Nikiya Harris Dodd, declined to seek re-election.

Each Wisconsin State Senate district is composed of three State Assembly districts.  The 6th Senate district comprises the 16th, 17th, and 18th Assembly districts.  The current representatives of those districts are: 
 Assembly District 16: Kalan Haywood (D–Milwaukee)
 Assembly District 17: Supreme Moore Omokunde (D–Milwaukee)
 Assembly District 18: Evan Goyke (D–Milwaukee)

The district is also located mostly within Wisconsin's 4th congressional district, which is represented by U.S. Representative Gwen Moore.

Past senators
At Wisconsin statehood the Senate had only nineteen districts, whose boundaries were defined in Article XIV of the Constitution of Wisconsin.  The 6th district was defined as Grant County, in the southwest corner of the state.

After the fifth session (1852) of the state legislature, the Senate was expanded to 25 members and a reapportionment occurred.  The 6th district was moved to the north side of Milwaukee County.  Through the subsequent 160 years of redistricting, the 6th district has remained in this location, though the boundaries have shifted.

See also
 Political subdivisions of Wisconsin

Notes

External links
District 6 Constituency Site

Wisconsin State Senate districts
Milwaukee County, Wisconsin
1848 establishments in Wisconsin